2010 general election  may refer to:

 2010 Anguillan general election
 2010 Australian federal election
 2010 Bougainvillean general election
 2010 Brazilian general election
 2010 Burmese general election
 2010 Cook Islands general election
 2010 Costa Rican general election
 2010 Dutch general election
 2010 Ethiopian general election
 2010 Haitian general election
 2010 Mauritian general election
 2010 Netherlands Antilles general election
 2010 New Brunswick general election
 2010 Philippine general election
 2010 Saint Kitts and Nevis general election
 2010 Solomon Islands general election
 2010 Sudanese general election
 2010 Swedish general election
 2010 Tanzanian general election
 2010 Tongan general election
 2010 Trinidad and Tobago general election
 2010 United Kingdom general election